Symphony Hall may refer to:

United States
 Atlanta Symphony Hall, Atlanta, Georgia
 Miller Symphony Hall, Allentown, Pennsylvania
 Symphony Hall, Boston, Boston, Massachusetts
 Newark Symphony Hall, Newark, New Jersey
 Phoenix Symphony Hall, Phoenix, Arizona
 Symphony Hall, Springfield, Springfield, Massachusetts

Japan
 Muza Kawasaki Symphony Hall, Kawasaki, Kanagawa
 The Symphony Hall, Osaka
 Okayama Symphony Hall, Okayama

Elsewhere
 Symphony Hall, Birmingham, Birmingham, England, UK

Other uses
 Symphony Hall (Sirius XM), a classical music satellite radio channel

See also
 Louise M. Davies Symphony Hall, San Francisco, California, US
 Concert hall
 List of concert halls
 Orchestra Hall (disambiguation)

Architectural disambiguation pages